Alan Webb may refer to:

 Alan Webb (actor) (1906–1982), English actor
 Alan Webb (runner) (born 1983), American track athlete
 Alan Webb (footballer) (born 1963), retired English association football player

See also
 Allan Webb (disambiguation)